Irineu is the Portuguese version of the name Irenaeus.

This name is borne by:

People 
Irineu Calixto Couto
Irineu Evangelista de Sousa
Victor Irineu de Souza

Organizations 
Sociedade Esportiva Irineu, Brazilian football club